Kalamon is a town in the far northeast of Ivory Coast. It is a sub-prefecture of Doropo Department in Bounkani Region, Zanzan District, adjacent to the border with Burkina Faso. There is a border crossing with Burkina Faso located four kilometres northeast of town.

Kalamon was a commune until March 2012, when it became one of 1126 communes nationwide that were abolished.

In 2014, the population of the sub-prefecture of Kalamon was 5,965.

Villages
The twenty one villages of the sub-prefecture of Kalamon and their population in 2014 are:

Notes

Sub-prefectures of Bounkani
Burkina Faso–Ivory Coast border crossings
Former communes of Ivory Coast